Below are the rosters for the UNCAF Nations Cup 2007 tournament in El Salvador, from February 8 to 18, 2007.

Group A

Head coach:  Carlos de los Cobos

Head coach: Hernán Darío Gómez

Head coach: TBA

Head coach:  Carlos Alberto de Toro

Group B

Head coach:  Hernán Medford

Head coach:  José de la Paz Herrera

Head coach:  Alexandre Guimarães

References

Copa Centroamericana squads
squads